Nicholas Jago (born 19 July 1976) is an English musician, best known as the former drummer and founding member of Black Rebel Motorcycle Club.

Jago was born in Abadan, Iran, to an English father and Peruvian mother and grew up in Devon, England. He attended St Cuthbert Mayne School in Torquay then specialized in art and design at South Devon College. He went on to study a degree in Fine Art Painting at the Winchester School of Art in Hampshire. He moved to the San Francisco Bay Area in the United States in 1995 whilst visiting family. He switched his focus to music and joined a band with Robert Levon Been and Peter Hayes. They moved to Los Angeles after garnering music business interest.

Jago was removed from the stage at the 2003 NME Awards during a rather extensive moment of silence on his part while accepting the "Best Video" award for BRMC's "Whatever Happened to My Rock 'n' Roll (Punk Song)". After leaving the group for a period of time, Jago and the band went on to release the album Howl on 22 August 2005 and the follow up Baby 81 in May 2007.

In June 2008, Jago released a bulletin on MySpace stating that he was leaving the band in order to focus on some personal growth and creative goals.

References

1977 births
Living people
English rock drummers
English male singers
English songwriters
English Buddhists
English rock guitarists
Black Rebel Motorcycle Club members
English male guitarists
21st-century English singers
21st-century British guitarists
21st-century drummers
21st-century British male singers
British male songwriters
Members of Sōka Gakkai
Nichiren Buddhists